Divan Posthumus (born 2 June 1994) is an South African cricketer who plays for the Easterns cricket team.

Career 
Posthumus originally started playing cricket for the Easterns Under-19 cricket team during the 2012–13 Coca-Cola Khaya Majole season. He was then selected to play for the Easterns for the 2021-22 CSA 4-Day Series. He made his first-class debut on 18 November 2021, against the South Westerns Districts cricket team. Posthumus also played matches against the Northern Cape, Mpumalanga, and Border cricket teams throughout the entirety of Division 2. In March 2022, Posthumus was named in the Easterns squad for the 2021-22 CSA Provincial One-Day Challenge. Posthumus made his List A debut on 16 March 2022, against South Western Districts.

References 

South African cricketers
1994 births
Living people
Cricketers from Johannesburg
Easterns cricketers